Ege University or Aegean University is a public research university in Bornova, İzmir. It was founded in 1955 with the faculties of Medicine and Agriculture. It is the first university to start courses in İzmir and the 4th oldest university in Turkey.

History
By 1982, Ege University was one of the largest universities in Turkey with 19 faculties, 9 junior college-type schools and 8 institutes. That same year, part of the university was separated into a new university, Dokuz Eylül University. After the division, Ege University had 7 faculties, 3 junior college-type schools and approximately 9000 students. It currently consists of 15 faculties, 6 junior college-type schools, 10 vocational training schools, 9 institutes and 36 research centres.

Academic units

Faculties 
 Faculty of Letters
 Faculty of Education
 Faculty of Communication
 Faculty of Economics and Administrative Sciences
 Faculty of Science
 Faculty of Engineering
 Faculty of Fisheries
 Faculty of Agriculture
 Faculty of Art, Design and Architecture
 Faculty of Sport Science
 Faculty of Health Sciences
 Faculty of Dentistry
 Faculty of Pharmacy
 Faculty of Medicine
 Faculty of Nursing
 Faculty of Law

Institutes 
 Graduate School of Natural and Applied Sciences
 Institute of Solar Energy
 Institute on Drug Abuse, Toxicology and Pharmaceutical Sciences
 Institute of Nuclear Sciences
 Institute of Health Sciences
 Institute of Social Sciences
 Institute of Turkish World Studies
 International Computer Institute

Campus
Bornova Campus of Ege University is situated on an area of 370 hectares. The campus covers a wide range of facilities including culture, sports and social services. Car park, road and traffic signs and directions are available throughout. Intercity, national and international communication from the campus is possible owing to phone lines and a computer network.

Since the campus is at the crossroad between Ankara, Istanbul, and Izmir, intercity transportation is very fast. Apart from this, intercity transportation provided by municipal bus and underground services enables students to reach the campus from every part of the city. The General Directorate of Students' Credits and Dormitories administers dormitories, which provide facilities for 6000 students on campus.

Apart from the rectorate and university campus in Bornova, there are vocational training schools in Tire, Bergama, Bayındır and Ödemiş, Atatürk Cultural Center in Konak, applied educational centers in Urla, Menemen, Mordoğan, Çiğli and Özdere, and an observatory in Kurudağ. With these facilities, Ege University serves the students and the public in terms of education, science, health, social, and cultural services. To extend these services, a West Campus was recently [when?] established in Çeşme.

Student life and culture

Ege University offers opportunities for personal, cultural, social and professional development that complement the richly complex and challenging academic life. These activities take place in the newly restored Culture and Arts Hall with accommodation for 330 spectators, the Amphitheater with accommodation for 5000 spectators, Atatürk Cultural Center (with 2 auditoriums with accommodation respectively for 654 and 628 spectators, 4 seminar rooms with accommodation for 45 spectators, a theater hall, 8 workshop rooms with accommodation for 12 spectators, and an exhibition gallery with a capacity of 800 guests) and the conference halls of faculties and schools. At the beginning of each academic year and during the weekend, parties are organized for students' enjoyment as a change of pace from academic routine. Excursions to historical and tourist sites are organized as a change of pace from the daily academic routine.

An Art Gallery was established in March 1997, and it provides a convenient place for exhibitions. In this way, students, academic and administrative staff have an opportunity to pursue cultural activities on campus. Art Studios have been established to organize fine arts courses for students.

There are 45 student clubs which are active in diverse fields. The General Directorate of Health, Culture and Sports organizes the activities of these student clubs.

One of the most favored social and cultural activities in Ege University is the traditional Sports and Arts Festival: It is organized every year during May. Concerts, sport games, cinema and theater presentations, sale and promotion stands, conferences, symposia, scientific meetings, fashion shows and competitions take place during the festival. Also, student groups from other Turkish universities and from foreign countries participate.

There is students' camp located in Özdere with a capacity of 200 beds. There are 10 periods in the summer vacation during which students, academic and administrative staff can make use of the camp. Activities and entertainment are organized to provide a comfortable and informal atmosphere.

The construction of the new private on-campus student dormitories with a capacity of 2000 students was completed. The Counseling and Advisory Service Department also helps to provide accommodation.

See also
 Edwards Villa
 Ege University Observatory
 List of universities in İzmir

References

External links
 Ege University (official web site) 
 Ege University Information Package/Course Catalogue
 Ege University Science and Technology Centre- Technology Transfer Office (EBILTEM-TTO) 
 EGE Technopark
 Ege University Campus Map

 
Florence Network
1955 establishments in Turkey
Educational institutions established in 1955